Komárom Városi Sportegyesület is a professional football club based in Komárom, Komárom-Esztergom County, Hungary, that competes in the Nemzeti Bajnokság III, the third tier of Hungarian Football.

Name changes
1946–49: Szőnyi MOLAJ FC
1949–51: Szőnyi MASZOLAJ Lombik
1951–52: Szőnyi Szikra
1952–57: Szőnyi MASZOLAJ Szikra
1957–60: Szőnyi MOLAJ SE
1960–62: Szőnyi Olajmunkás
1962–98: Komáromi Olajmunkás SE
1967: merger with Komárom Textil
1998–00: MOLAJ SE
2000–present: Komárom VSE

External links
 Official website of Komárom VSE
 Profile on Magyar Futball

References

Football clubs in Hungary
Association football clubs established in 1947
1947 establishments in Hungary